Ferdinand Wilhelm Ernst, 2nd Prince of Solms-Braunfels  (8 February 1721 in Braunfels – 2 October 1783, ibid.) was the second Prince of Solms-Braunfels. He was the son of Frederick William, Prince of Solms-Braunfels (1696–1761) by his first wife Princess Magdalena Henrietta of Nassau-Weilburg (1691–1725).

Life 
Ferdinand Wilhelm Ernst was born in Braunfels, Solms-Braunfels as the first son and child of Frederick William, Count of Solms-Braunfels and his first wife Princess Magdalena Henriette of Nassau-Weilburg (1691–1725) daughter of Johann Ernst, Prince of Nassau-Weilburg. On 22 May 1742, Emperor Charles VII raised the House of Solms-Braunfels to the rank of Imperial Prince and so when his father died he succeeded him as the 2nd Prince.

Marriage and issue 
On 24 August 1756 he married in Laubach, Countess Sophie Christine Wilhelmine of Solms-Laubach. She was the first daughter and second child of Christian August, Count of Solms-Laubach and his first wife Princess Elisabeth of Isenburg und Büdingen zu Birstein daughter of the first Prince, Wolfgang Ernest I. They had the following children:
 William Christian Carl, 3rd Prince of Solms-Braunfels (1759–1837), married Wild- und Rheingräfin Auguste of Salm-Grumbach and Elisabetha Becker, had issue from both marriages
 Princess Karoline Marie Eleonore of Solms-Braunfels (6 Oct 1760 - 30 Oct 1760)
 Prince Ludwig Wilhelm of Solms-Braunfels (12 Sep 1762 - 29 Oct 1762)
 Princess Auguste Luise of Solms-Braunfels (1764–1797) married Karl Ludwig, Wild- und Rheingraf zu Salm-Grumbach und Dhaun, whose first wife was Princess Marianne of Leiningen, daughter of Carl Friedrich Wilhelm, 1st Prince of Leiningen and parents of her brother William's wife.
 Prince Wilhelm Henrich Kasimir of Solms-Braunfels (1765–1852) unmarried
 Princess Luise Karoline Sophie of Solms-Braunfels (1766–1830) unmarried
 Prince Karl August Wilhelm Friedrich (1768–1829) unmarried
 Prince Frederick William of Solms-Braunfels (1770–1814) married Princess Frederica of Mecklenburg-Strelitz, widow of Prince Louis Charles of Prussia and had issue
 Prince Ludwig Wilhelm Christian of Solms-Braunfels (1771–1833) unmarried
 Princess Ferdinande Wilhelmine Isabelle of Solms-Braunfels (died within a year)

References 
 Ferdinand 2.Fürst zu Solms-Braunfels

External links
 
 House of Solms

House of Solms-Braunfels
House of Solms
1721 births
1783 deaths
18th-century German people